The 2020–21 season was Abha's fourth non-consecutive season in the Pro League and their 55th season in existence. The club participated in the Pro League and the King Cup.

The season covered the period from 22 September 2020 to 30 June 2021.

Players

Squad information

Out on loan

Transfers and loans

Transfers in

Loans in

Transfers out

Loans out

Pre-season

Competitions

Overview

Goalscorers

Last Updated: 30 May 2021

Assists

Last Updated: 30 May 2021

Clean sheets

Last Updated: 15 April 2021

References

Abha Club seasons
Abha